Glenbrook Tunnel may refer to:
Glenbrook Tunnel (1892)
Glenbrook Tunnel (1913)